Höglund or Hoglund is a Swedish surname meaning "High Grove"  and may refer to:

August Höglund (1855–1926), Swedish convert to The Church of Jesus Christ of Latter-day Saints, the first Mormon missionary to Russia
Bo Höglund (born 1948), Swedish actor
Greg Hoglund, member of the security community including the Black Hat Society, author on computer security and computer hacking
Gunnar Höglund (1923–1984), Swedish actor, film director and screenwriter
Holger Höglund (1906–1965), Swedish film actor
Jonas Höglund (born 1972), Swedish professional ice hockey player
Kjell Höglund (born 1945), Swedish musician who sings and writes his own songs
Mikael Höglund (born 1962), Swedish bass player, previously of the bands Tryckvåg, Great King Rat and Thunder
Panu Petteri Höglund (born 1966) Finnish linguist and novelist
Sven Höglund (1910–1995), Swedish road racing cyclist who competed in the 1932 Summer Olympics
Zeth Höglund (1884–1956), leading Swedish communist politician, an Anti-Militarist, author, journalist and mayor of Stockholm (1940–1950)

See also
Hoglund Ballpark, a baseball stadium in Lawrence, Kansas

References

Swedish-language surnames